A head house is an enclosed building attached to an open-sided shed.

Head House may refer to:

Head House (Prescott, Arizona), listed on the National Register of Historic Places in Yavapai County, Arizona
Head House (Middletown, Kentucky), listed on the National Register of Historic Places in Jefferson County, Kentucky
the Head House of Head House Square, a National Register of Historic Places-listed historic district in Philadelphia, Pennsylvania